I Hired a Contract Killer is a film directed, produced and written by the Finnish auteur Aki Kaurismäki in 1990. It is a Finnish-British-German-Swedish co-production and stars the renowned French actor Jean-Pierre Léaud. The film also features cameo appearances by Joe Strummer as a guitar player and by Kaurismäki as a sunglasses salesman. The film was remade in 1998 as Bulworth, staring Warren Beatty.

Plot
Henri Boulanger (Léaud), a French man living in London, is laid-off from his job after fifteen years of service. He tries to commit suicide but because he continuously fails, decides to hire a hitman (Kenneth Colley) to finish the job. After making the contract he meets Margaret (Margi Clarke) and finds new meaning to life, however, he is unable to call off the hitman.

See also
 Tribulations of a Chinaman in China (novel by Jules Verne, 1879)
 Flirting with Fate (1916)
 The Man in Search of His Murderer (1931)
 The Whistler (1944)
 You Only Live Once (1952)
 Five Days (1954)
 Up to His Ears (1965)
 Tulips (1981)
 Bulworth (1998)
 Shut Up and Shoot Me (2005)

References

External links
 
 
 
 
 
 
 

1990 films
1990 comedy-drama films
English-language Finnish films
Films about contract killing
Films about suicide
Films directed by Aki Kaurismäki
Films set in London
Finnish comedy-drama films
1990s English-language films